Joc Simmons is an American former professional tennis player.

Raised in Tulsa, Oklahoma, Simmons played two seasons of collegiate tennis at the University of Oklahoma and won a Big Eight title both years. Transferring to Mississippi State, he partnered with Laurent Miquelard to win the 1994 NCAA doubles championship. The pair received a place in the doubles main draw of the 1994 US Open.

References

External links
 
 

Year of birth missing (living people)
Living people
American male tennis players
Tennis people from Oklahoma
Mississippi State Bulldogs tennis players
Oklahoma Sooners men's tennis players
Sportspeople from Tulsa, Oklahoma